Sandy Beach may refer to:

Gaming
 Sandy Beach (video game)

Canada
 Sandy Beach, Alberta, a village
 Sandy Beach, Saskatchewan, a defunct village

United States
 Sandy Beach (Oahu), a beach in Hawaii
 Sandy Beach, New York, a hamlet

See also
 Sand Beach (disambiguation)
 Beach (disambiguation)
 Sand (disambiguation)